The Hotham River is one of the major tributaries of the Murray River in Western Australia.

From Narrogin, the merged river flows in a northerly direction through the Cuballing district and Dryandra Woodland before heading west through Wandering and Boddington.

The river joins the Williams River near Mount Saddleback.

History
The river was explored by Thomas Bannister in 1830 and probably named by Governor James Stirling after Admiral Sir Henry Hotham.

References

Rivers of the Peel region
Darling Range